The Kawasaki KDX200 is an intermediate enduro motorcycle intended predominantly for off-road use. It was introduced in 1983 after revisions to the preceding KDX175. It has been a long-standing model in Kawasaki's lineup, having been introduced in the early 1980s, seeing several revisions along the way up to the end of its production in 2006. The KDX200 had Kawasaki's KIPS (Kawasaki Integrated Powervalve System), assisting to maximize mid-range to top end power.

Generational revisions

While performance specs remain consistent for all specific models, some differences may apply to non-American models such as frame and plastic color, metal fuel tank, oil injection, features such as blinker lights, high output coil/stator, battery rack, luggage rack, etc.

KDX200 "A" (1983-1985)

KDX200 "B" (1984-1985) runs concurrently with A model variations unconfirmed - possibly local market changes.

First KDX200. 198cc engine upped from the preceding 173cc.

-Gain in displacement volume is through longer stroke; Bore diameter remains the same as the 175.

-New gear ratios in six-speed transmission, one more clutch plate added(7 from 6)

-Chassis based on 1983 KX125; steel tubing, box-section aluminum swingarm,

-Adjustable damping aluminum shock, 38mm Kayaba forks,

-Electronic odometer

-1984(A2) available in green, or black frame with red plastic

-1985 - new 34mm Mikuni “R” slide carburetor

KDX200 "C" (1986-1988)

New KIPS powervalve system, new 43mm conventional forks, new rear shock, front disc brake

KDX200 "E" (1989-1994)

Many key upgrades came to the KDX200 in 1989. It received liquid cooling, a modified powervalve system with larger expansion bottle and valves, a heavier crank, dual disc brakes, heavier clutch springs and more plates, a newly modeled frame with a modern style linkage, KX125-based shock with 16 compression and 16 rebound adjustments, quick release access for rear wheel, large airbox, and a  fuel tank.

-41 mm upside down forks came standard in 93 and 94 models

KDX200 "H" (1995-2006)

Notes: 1995 brought a modern new look and a redesigned KIPS powervalve system including larger valves and a central powervalve in the exhaust manifold.

-First perimeter frame

-43mm Kayaba cartridge type forks

-higher compression

-Larger radiators

-Larger clutch

-Taller seat

The KDX200 saw its last production run in 2006, with left over models being sold through 2007 and into mid 2008 in some areas.

References

KDX200
Off-road motorcycles